Christopher Paul Farrelly (born 2 March 1962) is a British Labour Party politician, banker and journalist, who was the Member of Parliament (MP) for Newcastle-under-Lyme from 2001 to 2019.

Early life
Farrelly was born in Newcastle-under-Lyme, Staffordshire, the son of an Irish gas pipe-laying foreman and a former nurse. He was the first Member of Parliament (MP) reared in Newcastle to represent the constituency since before 1900.

Farrelly was educated at Wolstanton Grammar School (which later became Marshlands Comprehensive High School) on Milehouse Lane in Newcastle-under-Lyme  He studied at St Edmund Hall, Oxford on a scholarship  where he graduated with a BA in Philosophy, Politics and Economics in 1984. After his education, he worked at managerial level in the corporate finance department with Barclays de Zoete Wedd, and, in 1990 joined Reuters as a correspondent and news editor. He was appointed as the deputy business editor with the Independent on Sunday in 1995 before joining The Observer in 1997 as the City Editor, where he remained until his election to Westminster.

Parliamentary career

Before his election, Farrelly held elected office within the Hornsey and Wood Green Constituency Labour Party as well as in Newcastle-under-Lyme. He unsuccessfully contested Chesham and Amersham at the 1997 general election, finishing in third place 16,058 votes behind sitting Conservative MP, Cheryl Gillan.

Farrelly was selected to contest his hometown seat of Newcastle-under-Lyme following the retirement of the Labour MP Llin Golding at the 2001 general election, and he held the seat comfortably with a majority of 9,986. He made his maiden speech on 12 July 2001. In the House of Commons, he served on several select committees including the Science and Technology Select Committee and, from the 2005 general election, the Culture, Media and Sport Select Committee.

A written Parliamentary question by Farrelly, answered on 19 October 2009, became the subject of debate, as The Guardian newspaper was prevented from reporting on it by a super-injunction.
To ask the Secretary of State for Justice, what assessment he has made of the effectiveness of legislation to protect (a) whistleblowers and (b) press freedom following the injunctions obtained in the High Court by (i) Barclays and Freshfields solicitors on 19 March 2009 on the publication of internal Barclays reports documenting alleged tax avoidance schemes and (ii) Trafigura and Carter-Ruck solicitors on 11 September 2009 on the publication of the Minton report on the alleged dumping of toxic waste in the Ivory Coast, commissioned by Trafigura.

At the 2010 general election, Farrelly was returned to parliament with a majority of 1,552. On 4 November 2010, he was involved in an altercation with a man, Bjorn Hurrell, during a karaoke night at the Houses of Parliament Sports and Social club, which resulted in Farrelly wrestling Hurrell to the ground. Farrelly later said he was acting in self-defence.

Farrelly's majority was reduced to 650 in 2015. He supported Owen Smith in the failed attempt to replace Jeremy Corbyn in the 2016 Labour Party leadership election.

Farrelly was one of 47 Labour MPs who defied the party whip to vote against the European Union (Notification of Withdrawal) Act 2017. The Act allowed the government to invoke Article 50, triggering the beginning of the process of British withdrawal from the European Union.

Farrelly was one of 13 MPs to vote against triggering the 2017 general election. In the ensuing election, he retained his seat by just 30 votes. There was confusion in the constituency on polling day, where thousands of students were initially rejected due to errors with the electoral register.

In November 2017, the Mail on Sunday reported that Farrelly “launched a foul-mouthed tirade” at fellow Labour MP James Frith. Labour said it would be launching an investigation after it received "a number of complaints".

In March 2018, Farrelly was accused of bullying Emily Commander, the former clerk of the Digital, Culture, Media and Sport Committee. She reported having “repeated nightmares about going on Committee visits” with him. Two other female clerks also complained about his conduct, including one being asked repeated questions about her marital status. One described how her boss, a senior clerk still working at the House, had told her: “Mr Farrelly was known to be an awful man, or words to that effect, and that he had previously made the lives of female members of staff ...very difficult”. An internal report into his conduct found his behaviour amounted to “an abuse of power or position, unfair treatment and undermining a competent worker by constant criticism”. A formal inquiry into the allegations was blocked by MPs and Farrelly called the accusations 'baseless'.

In March 2018, the Parliamentary Commissioner for Standards found Farrelly broke the House of Commons code of conduct by using Commons stationery during his electioneering campaign, sending out 1000 canvassing letters in the run up to the election as if they had been sent by the House. Farrelly issued an apology and paid back the cost of the stationery.

Farrelly announced in September 2019 that he would not be fighting the next general election, which was subsequently held in December of the same year. He said of his decision that "I also still have a young family to support, and it would not be fair on them". His parliamentary successor who won the seat for the Tories in 2019 was Aaron Bell.

References

External links

 Official website

 Column archive at The Guardian and The Observer

1962 births
Living people
Alumni of St Edmund Hall, Oxford
Labour Party (UK) MPs for English constituencies
People from Newcastle-under-Lyme
UK MPs 2001–2005
UK MPs 2005–2010
The Guardian journalists
British people of Irish descent
UK MPs 2010–2015
UK MPs 2015–2017
UK MPs 2017–2019
Members of the Parliament of the United Kingdom for Newcastle-under-Lyme
People educated at Wolstanton Grammar School